Poul Verner Svendsen (born 21 April 1927) is a Danish rower who competed in the 1952 Summer Olympics. Svendsen was born in Copenhagen in 1927. In 1952 he was a crew member of the Danish boat which won the bronze medal in the coxed pair event.

References

1927 births
Living people
Danish male rowers
Olympic rowers of Denmark
Rowers at the 1952 Summer Olympics
Olympic bronze medalists for Denmark
Olympic medalists in rowing
Medalists at the 1952 Summer Olympics
Rowers from Copenhagen